Haskell is a purely functional programming language.

Haskell may also refer to:

People
 Haskell (surname)
 Haskell (given name)

Places

United States
 Haskell, Arkansas, a city
 Haskell, Indiana, an unincorporated community
 Haskell, New Jersey, an unincorporated community
 Haskell, Oklahoma, a town
 Haskell, Texas, a city
 Haskell County, Kansas 
 Haskell County, Oklahoma 
 Haskell County, Texas
 Haskell Township (disambiguation)
 Haskell Pass, Montana

Antarctica
 Haskell Glacier, Ellsworth Land
 Mount Haskell, Graham Land
 Haskell Ridge, Oates Land
 Haskell Strait, Antarctica

Businesses in the United States
 Haskell (company), a US-based architecture, engineering, and construction firm
 Haskell Manufacturing Company, a former plywood and canoe manufacturer in Ludington, Michigan
 Haskelite Manufacturing Corporation, a former plywood manufacturer in Grand Rapids, Michigan

School-related
 Haskell Indian Nations University, in Lawrence, Kansas
 Haskell Indian Nations Fighting Indians, the athletic programs of the university
 Haskell Memorial Stadium
 Haskell School (Troy, New York), a former school and historic building in Troy, New York
 Haskell School (Boston, Massachusetts), one of the schools that formed The Cambridge School of Weston
 Haskell Oriental Museum, a forerunner of the Oriental Institute of the University of Chicago

Other uses
 Haskell House (disambiguation)
 Haskell Free Library and Opera House, a neoclassical building located in Rock Island, Quebec and Derby Line, Vermont
 Haskell Stakes, a Grade I race for thoroughbred horses held in New Jersey
 Haskell organ pipe construction, in which a pipe is nested in a larger one to obtain the same pitch with a shorter pipe
 Haskell-class attack transports, amphibious assault ships of the United States Navy created in 1944
 , lead ship of the class
 Eddie Haskell, a fictional character in the American sitcom Leave It to Beaver

See also
 Haskell-Baker Wetlands, Kansas, US
 Chaskel (disambiguation)